"Mighty High" is 1975 disco/R&B single by Los Angeles-based gospel group, Mighty Clouds of Joy written by David Crawford.

Charts
The single proved to be very popular with disco fans as the song stayed at number one on the disco/dance chart for five weeks, and remained on the chart for a total of fourteen weeks  Mighty High" was their biggest hit on both the soul chart, peaking at #22, and on the Billboard Hot 100, peaking at #69.

Chart performance

Cover versions
A cover by Gloria Gaynor with The Trammps made the song a hit once again on the Disco/Dance chart. It reached #12 in 1997.

References

1975 singles
Disco songs
Gloria Gaynor songs
Songs written by Dave Crawford (musician)
1975 songs